Ardmeanach in modern times refers to a peninsula on the Isle of Mull. It is the middle one out of three westward-facing peninsulas on the island, and the name in Gaelic means "Middle Headland" or "Middle Height". It is about 20 km (12 miles) long and 6 km (4 miles) wide, and lies between Loch Scridain and Loch Na Keal. It is mountainous and includes Ben More, the highest mountain on the island. It is largely uninhabited, with a few isolated settlements along the coast. It is cut in two by a narrow valley (Gleann Seilisdeir) which runs north–south between the two sea lochs and carries the B8035 road. The peninsula (or its western end) is a Special Area of Conservation.

Black Isle
According to the Encyclopædia Britannica Eleventh Edition, the Black Isle was historically called Ardmeanach (Gaelic ard, height; maniach, monk) from an old religious house there.

References

Landforms of the Isle of Mull
Peninsulas of Scotland
Landforms of Argyll and Bute